Railway Romance is a 2002 Russian drama film directed by Ivan Solovov.

Plot 
The film tells about a good Muscovite named Alexei, who meets a girl. They agree on a date, but as a result, Alexei loses his job and apartment. Various troubles begin to occur regularly with him and now, many years later, on the eve of the New Year, he meets her again.

Cast 
 Egor Beroev as Aleksei
 Olga Budina as Vera
 Aleksey Frandetti	
 Nina Grebeshkova as Vera's Mother
 Leonid Kuravlyov as Petrovich
 Aleksandr Semchev as Valeriy Semyonovich

References

External links 
 

2002 films
2000s Russian-language films
Russian drama films
2002 drama films